The New Atlanta is an American reality television series that aired on Bravo and premiered on September 17, 2013. The series was green-lit on November 27, 2012, under the working title of Taking Atlanta. It would later emerge with its current title on July 17, 2013. The New Atlanta chronicles the lives of five young adults — Africa Miranda, Alexandra Dilworth, Emily Lipman, Jevon "Vawn" Sims, and Tribble Reese — who are building their empires and achieving their dreams in Atlanta, Georgia.

Episodes

References

External links
 The New Atlanta at Internet Movie Database
 

2010s American reality television series
2013 American television series debuts
2013 American television series endings
English-language television shows
Television shows set in Atlanta
Bravo (American TV network) original programming